Amblyseius nambourensis is a species of mite in the family Phytoseiidae.

References

nambourensis
Articles created by Qbugbot
Animals described in 1981